Badminton at the 2013 Palarong Pambansa were held in The Court - LP Hyper Mart. A total of 14 events were held. This article lists the winners.

Medal summary

Medal table

Elementary Division

High School Division

References

External links 
2013 Palarong Pambansa Official Website
2013 Palarong Pambansa Special Coverage by Rappler.com
Department of Education

2013
Palarong Pambansa
Palarong